Grandma is a 1979 Argentine comedy drama film directed by Héctor Olivera and starring Pepe Soriano, Juan Carlos Altavista and Osvaldo Terranova.

Synopsis 
A poor Argentine family of Italian origin lives with their grandmother Carmen, known by all as "La nona" (grandma in Italian). Despite her advanced age, La nona eats nonstop, while the family struggles with the bills and to feed her at the same time. La nona brings the family to the edge of ruin, whose members begins to look for the most diverse ways to earn money and eventually get rid of the old woman.

Cast 

 Pepe Soriano as Carmen Racazzi, la Nona
 Juan Carlos Altavista as Chicho Spadone
 Osvaldo Terranova as Carmelo Spadone
 Eva Franco as Anyula Spadone
 Nya Quesada as María Spadone
 Graciela Alfano as Marta "Martita" Spadone
 Guillermo Battaglia as Don Francisco
 Nelly Tesolín as Severe Nun
 Oscar Nuñez  as Luque
 Pedro Martínez as Vicente
 Vicente La Russa as Poroto
 Amanda Beitia as Friendly Nun
 Aldo Bigatti as Candy store owner
 Tacholas as Old man in asylum
 Horacio O'Connor as Anthropologist
 Coco Fossati as Street vendor
 Marta Roldán as Mother Superior 
 Max Berliner as Old man 2º
 Cayetano Biondo as Old man 3º
 Roberto Dairiens as Grocer
 Emilio Vidal as Baker
 Tony Middleton as Doctor
 Alfredo Quesada as Radiologist
 Gustavo Segal as Fishmonger
 Anita Bobazo as Old lady 1º
 Remedios Climent as Old lady 2º
 Pablo Nápoli as Police officer
 Héctor Ugazio as Old man 4º
 Horacio Guisado as Ophthalmologist
 Walter Korwell as Doorman at the Museum
 Raquel Oquendo as Old lady 3º
 Aurora Peris as Old lady 4º
 Miguel Angel Martinez as Cook at the asylum 
 Mario Kohut as Old man 5º
 Fernando Ayala as Justice of the peace
 Eduardo Santibanez as Fishmonger 2º
 Roberto Tarsitani as Pimp

BBC Version 
A made for TV version was produced in 1991 for the BBC Network, starring comic Les Dawson, as part of the Performance series.

BBC Cast 
 Les Dawson
 Liz Smith
 Jim Broadbent
 Timothy Spall
 Sue Brown
 Jane Horrocks
 Maurice Denham

References

External links 
 

1979 films
1970s Spanish-language films
1979 comedy-drama films
Films directed by Héctor Olivera
Films shot in Buenos Aires
Argentine comedy-drama films
1970s Argentine films